Senior assistant commissioner is a rank used in the Singapore Police Force, Singapore Civil Defence Force, the New South Wales Police Force of Australia, Royal Malaysia Police and the Hong Kong Police Force.

Australia
The rank of senior assistant commissioner has been abolished from all Police Forces and Services in Australia.

Singapore
In Singapore, a senior assistant commissioner of Police is a police rank of a senior officer in the Singapore Police Force above the rank of assistant commissioner and below that of a deputy commissioner of police.

Hong Kong
Hong Kong Police senior assistant commissioners are responsible for either
headquarter command roles or regional/geographic commands. SAC are head of departments and also referred to as Directors of these departments.

References 
Law enforcement in Australia
Singapore Police Force
Police ranks